Taupiri was a station on the North Island Main Trunk line with a goods shed and an island platform, serving the small settlement of Taupiri in the Waikato District of New Zealand.

A stationmaster's house and telegraph office were added in 1882 and a goods shed at about the same time. There were protests when the stationmaster was withdrawn in 1895 and the station was reduced to a flag station, though still staffed. In 1901 this resulted in a case of calves being left at the station.

Traffic grew as shown in the graph and table below.

Mangawara Bridges 272 and 273 
Wooden trestle bridge 57 was built in 1877 to cross the Mangawara Stream, just north of Taupiri. When the line was doubled in 1938, bridges 272 and 273 were built alongside. 273 (east) was replaced from 2015 and 272 (west) upgraded. The replacement used 390 tonnes of steel in two 24m girders connected to 5.5m cross beams. The bridge was the last of 8 bridge upgrades to increase line capacity.

References

External links 
Photos -

 1907 river steamer Freetrader providing link from Taupiri to Pokeno during floods

Buildings and structures in Waikato
Railway stations opened in 1877
Rail transport in Waikato
Defunct railway stations in New Zealand
Waikato District
1877 establishments in New Zealand